The legislative districts of Quezon are the representations of the province of Quezon and the highly urbanized city of Lucena in the various national legislatures of the Philippines. The province and the city are currently represented in the lower house of the Congress of the Philippines through their first, second, third, and fourth congressional districts.

History 
Areas now under the jurisdiction of Quezon, known as Tayabas until 1949, were initially represented by the at-large district of Tayabas, which elected three representatives, and the at-large district of Principe Infanta to the Malolos Congress in 1898; it remained so until 1899. Tayabas was later divided into two representative districts in 1907 for the Philippine Assembly. Marinduque was last represented as part of the province's second district in 1922, after its establishment as a regular province in 1920 warranted its separate representation. As a consequence, a minor reorganization of the composition of the districts of Tayabas took place to compensate for the reduced population of the second district. When seats for the upper house of the Philippine Legislature were elected from territory-based districts between 1916 and 1935, the province formed part of the fifth senatorial district which elected two out of the 24-member senate.

In the disruption caused by the Second World War, Tayabas was represented by two delegates in the National Assembly of the Japanese-sponsored Second Philippine Republic: one was the provincial governor (an ex officio member), while the other was elected through a provincial assembly of KALIBAPI members during the Japanese occupation of the Philippines. Its jurisdiction excluded the municipality of Infanta (including what is now General Nakar and Real) and the Polillo Islands, which were transferred to Laguna's jurisdiction. Upon the restoration of the Philippine Commonwealth in 1945, Tayabas's pre-war two-district representation was retained; this remained so until 1972.

The province of Quezon (with the sub-province of Aurora, established in 1951) was represented in the Interim Batasang Pambansa as part of Region IV-A from 1978 to 1984. The sub-province of Aurora was last represented as part of Quezon's first district in 1972, and as part of Quezon's representation in general in 1984, after its conversion into a regular province in 1979 entitled it to its own representation. The province elected four representatives at-large to the Regular Batasang Pambansa in 1984. It was redistricted into four congressional districts under the new Constitution which took effect on February 7, 1987, and elected members to the restored House of Representatives starting that same year.

Despite being administratively independent from the provincial government of Quezon since July 1, 1991, the city of Lucena elects a congressional representative as part of the second district, and has retained the right for its residents to elect and be elected to provincial offices through the exception made in Section 452-c of the Local Government Code of 1991 regarding a city declared as highly urbanized after 1986 but before 1992 and whose city charter (Republic Act No. 3271) contains a provision explicitly allowing participation in provincial affairs.

Current composition  
The province is composed of four districts, each composed of one member, with 2 from NPC, and one each from Lakas and Reporma. All are members of the majority bloc.

Historical and defunct district boundaries 
Tayabas, later Quezon has been redistricted 3 times since 1907. It included territories of now-provinces of Aurora and Marinduque.

At-large

1898–1899

1943–1944

1978–1986

Redistricting 
Quezon was last redistricted in 1987. Since then, two bills had been filed in the 17th and 18th Congress to reapportion the province's districts.

See also 
Legislative district of Marinduque
Legislative district of Aurora

References 

Quezon
Politics of Quezon